Maigret's Failure (French: Un échec de Maigret) is a detective novel by the Belgian writer Georges Simenon featuring his famous creation Jules Maigret.

Overview
Fumal, an infamous bully and the owner of meat-packing industry, orders Maigret to protect him after he comes to believe his life is in danger. However, Maigret, who was one of Fumal's targets for offense as a child, does very little to protect the man. Later, Fumal is viciously slaughtered, Maigret finds himself being blamed for the murder, and so must go about the agonizing task of bringing the murdered butcher's killer to justice.

Publishing history
Originally published in French in 1956 by Presses de la Cité as Un Echec de Maigret, the first English translation (translated by Daphne Woodward) was published by Hamish Hamilton in 1962. It was included in two anthologies, A Maigret Quartet (1972) and A Maigret Trio (1983).

Adaptations
A BBC TV version of the book first aired on November 6, 1961, under the title Death of a Butcher with Rupert Davies playing Maigret. Jean Richard played Maigret in the 1987 French TV version and Bruno Cremer in the 2003 adaptation.

References

1956 Belgian novels
Maigret novels
Presses de la Cité books